Fernando Gorriarán Fontes (born 27 November 1994) is a Uruguayan professional footballer who plays as a midfielder for Liga MX club Tigres UANL and the Uruguay national team.

Club career

River Plate
Born in Montevideo, Gorriarán grew up in the River Plate youth team. On 2 February 2014, he made his professional debut in 1–2 home loss against Uruguayan giants Peñarol. On 14 March 2015, he scored his first goal in a 2–1 away win against Nacional.

Ferencváros
On 11 June 2017, he was signed by Nemzeti Bajnokság I club Ferencvárosi TC. He signed a four-year contract with the Budapest-based club.

On 9 December 2017, he scored his first goal in the club in a 2–0 away win against Vasas.

Mexico
On 2019, he arrived to Liga MX club Santos Laguna. After several seasons with good performance, he was transferred to Tigres UANL on December, 2022.

International career
Gorriarán is a former Uruguayan youth international. He was part of under-22 team which won gold medal at 2015 Pan American Games.

On 5 March 2021, Gorriarán was named in Uruguay senior team's 35-man preliminary squad for 2022 FIFA World Cup qualifying matches against Argentina and Bolivia. However, CONMEBOL suspended those matches next day amid concern over the COVID-19 pandemic. He made his senior team debut on 9 June 2021 in a World Cup qualifying match against Venezuela. On 21 October 2022, he was named in Uruguay's 55-man preliminary squad for the 2022 FIFA World Cup.

Career statistics

Club

International

Honours
Ferencváros
Nemzeti Bajnokság I: 2018–19

Uruguay U22
Pan American Games: 2015

Individual
Liga MX Best XI: Guardianes 2021
Liga MX All-Star: 2021

References

External links
 
 Fernando Gorriarán at AUF 

1994 births
Living people
Footballers from Montevideo
Association football midfielders
Uruguayan footballers
Uruguay youth international footballers
Uruguay international footballers
Uruguayan Primera División players
Nemzeti Bajnokság I players
Liga MX players
Club Atlético River Plate (Montevideo) players
Ferencvárosi TC footballers
Santos Laguna footballers
Uruguayan expatriate footballers
Uruguayan expatriate sportspeople in Hungary
Uruguayan expatriate sportspeople in Mexico
Expatriate footballers in Hungary
Expatriate footballers in Mexico
Pan American Games medalists in football
Pan American Games gold medalists for Uruguay
Medalists at the 2015 Pan American Games
Footballers at the 2015 Pan American Games
2021 Copa América players